ABBA is a Swedish pop music group.

Abba or ABBA may also refer to:

Arts, entertainment, and media

Media related to the band Abba
 ABBA (album), a self-titled album by the Swedish pop music group ABBA
 ABBA: The Movie, a feature-length film about the pop group ABBA's 1977 Australian tour

Other arts, entertainment, and media
 ABBA, in poetry, a rhyme scheme also known as enclosed rhyme
 ABBA ABBA, a short novel by Anthony Burgess

Other uses
 A-B-B-A, a term used for a diesel electric locomotive lashup consisting of two cabless B units sandwiched between two cab A units
 ABBA, a sequence of penalty kick takers in a penalty shoot-out (association football)
 Abba Seafood, a Swedish seafood products company
 ABBA (political party), a right-wing Maltese political party
 ABBA SK, a Turkish sports club

Personal names and honorifics
 Ab (Semitic), also aba or abba, word for father in Aramaic
 Abba (surname)
 Abba (given name), and honorific

Places
 Abba, Anambra State, a place in Anambra State, Nigeria
 Abba, Imo, a place in Imo State, Nigeria
 Abba, Georgia, a community in the United States
 Abba River, a river in Western Australia

See also 
 ABA (disambiguation)
 Aba (disambiguation)
 Abas (disambiguation)
 Abbas (disambiguation)
 Abu (disambiguation)
 Av, the eleventh month of the civil year and the fifth month of the ecclesiastical year on the Hebrew calendar